Acacia mucronata, the variable sallow wattle or narrow-leaved wattle, is a shrub or small tree to 5 m high. It is native to southeast Australia, mainly the states of Tasmania and Victoria (where it is widespread and common in forests and woodland, mostly south of the Great Dividing Range). It often grows as an understorey tree or shrub in eucalypt forest or as a dominant in scrubland. In drier regions of its distribution, like in northeast Tasmania, it often grows along creeks and sheltered coastlines.

Description
There are 3 subspecies. Acacia mucronata subsp. longifolia is distinguished from the other 2 subspecies (both apparently Tasmanian endemics) in having phyllodes usually more than 9 cm long (rarely less than 10 times as long as wide) and usually acute, this is reflected in the name: mucronata, i.e. "mucronate, pointed".

Flowers in loose spikes 1–6 cm long, solitary or twinned, creamy white or pale yellow; rachis visible between flowers. Flowers in spring, usually Aug.–Dec.

References

mucronata
Fabales of Australia
Trees of Australia
Flora of Tasmania
Flora of Victoria (Australia)